Naim Maloku (born February 17, 1958 in Labljane, FPR Yugoslavia) is a Kosovar Albanian politician and former officer of the Kosovo Liberation Army. He is a member of the Assembly of Kosovo under the banner of the AAK party. In the 2008 presidential election, he was proposed by his party as a candidate for President of Kosovo, and subsequently supported by some other minor parties. He obtained 37 out of 81 required votes in the first round of elections, while his opponent, the president in demise, Fatmir Sejdiu, gained 62 votes. Maloku finally lost his bid to Sejdiu, who received 68 votes in the third round.

References

Living people
1958 births
Alliance for the Future of Kosovo politicians
Kosovo Liberation Army soldiers